The Bananal River is a river of the states of São Paulo and Rio de Janeiro in southeastern Brazil.
It is a tributary of the Paraíba do Sul.

The headwaters are protected by the  Mananciais do Rio Paraíba do Sul Environmental Protection Area, created in 1982 to protect the sources of the Paraíba do Sul river.

See also
List of rivers of Rio de Janeiro
List of rivers of São Paulo

References

Rivers of Rio de Janeiro (state)